Hasan Pepić (born 16 March 1993 in Podgorica) is a Montenegrin footballer of Albanian descent who plays as a left-winger for Bahlinger SC.

Club career
Pepić moved to Germany at a young age, and played youth football for a number of clubs in Baden-Württemberg before signing for Dynamo Dresden in July 2012. He made his debut for the club in the first game of the 2012–13 2. Bundesliga season, as a substitute for Filip Trojan in a 2–1 defeat to VfL Bochum. After six months with Dynamo, he signed for Juventus. In August 2013 he returned to Germany to sign for SSV Reutlingen.

References

External links

Hasan Pepić at FuPa

1993 births
Living people
Footballers from Podgorica
Association football wingers
Montenegrin footballers
Montenegro youth international footballers
Karlsruher SC II players
Dynamo Dresden II players
Dynamo Dresden players
Juventus F.C. players
SSV Reutlingen 05 players
SC Paderborn 07 II players
KSV Hessen Kassel players
Berliner AK 07 players
VfB Germania Halberstadt players
VSG Altglienicke players
Bahlinger SC players
Regionalliga players
2. Bundesliga players
Oberliga (football) players
Montenegrin expatriate footballers
Expatriate footballers in Germany
Montenegrin expatriate sportspeople in Germany
Albanians in Montenegro